The 2020 Thailand Masters (officially known as the Princess Sirivannavari Thailand Masters 2020 presented by Toyota for sponsorship reasons) was a badminton tournament which took place at Indoor Stadium Huamark in Thailand from 21 to 26 January 2020 and had a total purse of $170,000.

Tournament
The 2020 Thailand Masters was the third tournament of the 2020 BWF World Tour and also part of the Thailand Masters championships which had been held since 2016. This tournament was organized by the Badminton Association of Thailand with sanction from the BWF.

Venue
This international tournament was held at Indoor Stadium Huamark in Bangkok, Thailand.

Point distribution
Below is the point distribution for each phase of the tournament based on the BWF points system for the BWF World Tour Super 300 event.

Prize money
The total prize money for this tournament was US$170,000. Distribution of prize money was in accordance with BWF regulations.

Men's singles

Seeds

 Chen Long (withdrew)
 Shi Yuqi (semi-finals)
 Ng Ka Long (champion)
 Kanta Tsuneyama (second round)
 Srikanth Kidambi (first round)
 Kantaphon Wangcharoen (first round)
 Lee Zii Jia (second round)
 Wang Tzu-wei (second round)

Finals

Top half

Section 1

Section 2

Bottom half

Section 3

Section 4

Women's singles

Seeds

 Akane Yamaguchi (champion)
 Ratchanok Intanon (quarter-finals)
 An Se-young (final)
 Carolina Marín (semi-finals)
 Saina Nehwal (first round)
 Sung Ji-hyun (first round)
 Mia Blichfeldt (withdrew)
 Sayaka Takahashi (quarter-finals)

Finals

Top half

Section 1

Section 2

Bottom half

Section 3

Section 4

Men's doubles

Seeds

 Lee Yang / Wang Chi-lin (second round)
 Aaron Chia / Soh Wooi Yik (first round)
 Choi Sol-gyu / Seo Seung-jae (first round)
 Goh V Shem / Tan Wee Kiong (semi-finals)
 Han Chengkai / Zhou Haodong (first round)
 Kim Astrup / Anders Skaarup Rasmussen (first round)
 Takuro Hoki / Yugo Kobayashi (quarter-finals)
 He Jiting / Tan Qiang (first round)

Finals

Top half

Section 1

Section 2

Bottom half

Section 3

Section 4

Women's doubles

Seeds

 Chen Qingchen / Jia Yifan (champions)
 Misaki Matsutomo / Ayaka Takahashi (withdrew)
 Kim So-yeong / Kong Hee-yong (semi-finals)
 Lee So-hee / Shin Seung-chan (quarter-finals)
 Du Yue / Li Yinhui (quarter-finals)
 Greysia Polii / Apriyani Rahayu (withdrew)
 Jongkolphan Kititharakul / Rawinda Prajongjai (second round)
 Li Wenmei / Zheng Yu (quarter-finals)

Finals

Top half

Section 1

Section 2

Bottom half

Section 3

Section 4

Mixed doubles

Seeds

 Dechapol Puavaranukroh / Sapsiree Taerattanachai (withdrew)
 Seo Seung-jae / Chae Yoo-jung (withdrew)
 Goh Soon Huat / Shevon Jemie Lai (semi-finals)
 Hafiz Faizal / Gloria Emanuelle Widjaja (final)
 Tang Chun Man / Tse Ying Suet (second round)
 Marcus Ellis / Lauren Smith (champions)
 He Jiting / Du Yue (first round)
 Tan Kian Meng / Lai Pei Jing (semi-finals)

Finals

Top half

Section 1

Section 2

Bottom half

Section 3

Section 4

References

External links
 Tournament Link

Thailand Masters
Badminton, World Tour, Thailand Masters
Badminton, World Tour, Thailand Masters
Thailand Masters (badminton)
Badminton, World Tour, Thailand Masters